Mearley is a civil parish in Ribble Valley, Lancashire, England.  It contains three listed buildings that are recorded in the National Heritage List for England.  Of these, one is at Grade II*, the middle grade, and the others are at Grade II, the lowest grade.  The parish is entirely rural, and the listed buildings consist of three dwellings.

Key

Buildings

References

Citations

Sources

Lists of listed buildings in Lancashire
Buildings and structures in Ribble Valley